The 1874–75 New South Wales colonial election was held between 8 December 1874 and 12 January 1875. This election was for all of the 72 seats in the New South Wales Legislative Assembly and it was conducted in 52 single-member constituencies, six 2-member constituencies and two 4-member constituencies, all with a first past the post system. Suffrage was limited to adult white males. The previous parliament of New South Wales was dissolved on 28 November 1874 by the Governor, Sir Hercules Robinson, on the advice of the Premier, Henry Parkes.

There was no recognisable party structure at this election; instead the government was determined by a loose, shifting factional system.

Key dates

Results
{{Australian elections/Title row
| table style = float:right;clear:right;margin-left:1em;
| title        = New South Wales colonial election, 8 December 1874 – 12 January 1875
| house        = Legislative Assembly
| series       = New South Wales colonial election
| back         = 1872
| forward      = 1877
| enrolled     = 
| total_votes  = 60,031
| turnout %    = 47.21
| turnout chg  = −1.23
| informal     = 762
| informal %   = 1.20
| informal chg = +0.20
}}

|}

References

See also
 Members of the New South Wales Legislative Assembly, 1874–1877
 Candidates of the 1874–75 New South Wales colonial election

1874-75
1874 elections in Australia
1875 elections in Australia
1870s in New South Wales
December 1874 events
January 1875 events